Dorothy West (June 2, 1907 – August 16, 1998) was an American storyteller and short story writer during the time of the Harlem Renaissance. She is best known for her 1948 novel The Living Is Easy, as well as many other short stories and essays, about the life of an upper-class black family.

Early years
Dorothy West was born in Boston, Massachusetts, on June 2, 1907, the only child of Virginian Isaac Christopher West, who was enslaved at birth and became a successful businessman, and Rachel Pease Benson of Camden, South Carolina, one of 22 children. The poet Helene Johnson was her cousin. Late in life she wrote that in Boston Blacks "were taught very young to take the white man in stride or drown in their own despair". She detailed how her mother guided her and her many cousins, all with varied skin tones, into the inhospitable world:

West reportedly wrote her first story at the age of seven. Her first published work, a short story entitled "Promise and Fulfillment", appeared in The Boston Post when she was 14 years old, She was inspired to start writing stories by an advertisement for a writing contest she saw in her aunt's copy of the NAACP's magazine Crisis, which her mother thought carried news she wanted to shield her daughter from. She won several local writing competitions. West attended Girls' Latin school, now called Boston Latin Academy, graduating at 16, and went on to Boston University and the Columbia University School of Journalism.

In 1926, she tied for second place in a writing contest sponsored by Opportunity, a journal published by the National Urban League, with her short story "The Typewriter". The person West tied with was future novelist Zora Neale Hurston. "The Typewriter” appeared in Dodd Mead's annual anthology The Best Short Stories of 1926 alongside work by Ernest Hemingway, Ring Lardner, and Robert Sherwood.

Between 1928 and 1930, some of West's other early writings were published in the Saturday Evening Quill, a short-lived annual literary magazine that grew out of a literary club of the same name, of which West was a founding member.

Harlem Renaissance

Shortly before winning the Opportunity writing contest, West moved to Harlem with her cousin, the poet Helene Johnson. There West met other writers of the Harlem Renaissance, including Langston Hughes, Countee Cullen, and the novelist Wallace Thurman. West was quoted as saying in 1995: "We didn't know it was the Harlem Renaissance, because we were all young and all poor." Hughes gave West the nickname of "The Kid", by which she was known during her time in Harlem, and she was among a group of African Americans who traveled with him on a trip to Russia in 1932 for a film about American race relations. It provided material for a 1985 essay that described her encounter with the film director Sergei Eisenstein. The film was abandoned by the Russians, and she returned to the United States after a year when she learned of the death of her father.

During the Great Depression, West's principal contribution to the Harlem Renaissance was to publish the magazine Challenge, which she founded with $40 in 1934, the final issue being published in spring 1937. She also published the magazine's radical though shortlived successor, New Challenge, which published Richard Wright's groundbreaking essay "Blueprint for Negro Writing", together with writings by Margaret Walker and Ralph Ellison, but closed after one issue.

West never married, though Countee Cullen once proposed to her because his father thought it would end his homosexuality. After their trip to Russia, she offered a marriage proposal in writing to Langston Hughes, who declined.

Novelist and journalist

After struggling as a magazine publisher, West found secure employment with the Works Progress Administration's Federal Writers' Project until the mid-1940s. During this time she wrote a number of short stories for the New York Daily News, where she was the first black writer published. In 1947 she moved to her family's home in Oak Bluffs on Martha's Vineyard, where she had previously spent summers. There she wrote her first novel, The Living Is Easy. Featuring an ironic sense of humor unique to West's style, the story chronicles the life of a southern woman in pursuit of an upper-class lifestyle in Boston. One 21st-century assessment said it "satirizes the Black bourgeoisie". Published in 1948, the novel was well received critically but did not sell many copies. In The New York Times, Seymour Krim described it as "a housewifey novel: a look at life from the kitchen and the parlor", focused on characters who were women first and secondarily Black. He wrote: "The important thing about the book is its abundant and special woman's energy and beat. The beat is a deep one and it often makes a man's seem puny."

For the next four decades, West worked as a journalist, primarily writing for a small newspaper on Martha's Vineyard. In 1948, she started a weekly column about Oak Bluffs people, events, and nature. In 1982, The Feminist Press brought The Living Is Easy back into print, giving new attention to West and her role in the Harlem Renaissance and she was included in the 1992 anthology Daughters of Africa (ed. Margaret Busby). As a result of this renewed attention, at the age of 85 West finally finished a second novel, entitled The Wedding. Though its action occurs in the course of a weekend on Martha's Vineyard, it recounts the history of an affluent Black family over the course of centuries. She dedicated it to Jacqueline Kennedy Onassis, who late in life was an editor at West's publisher, Doubleday, who had encouraged her to complete it. Published to acclaim in 1995 – the Publishers Weekly review stated: "West's first novel in 45 years is a triumph." – the novel was a best-seller and resulted in the publication of a collection of West's short stories and reminiscences called The Richer, the Poorer. Its thirty selections included eleven pieces not published before. The New York Times reviewer advised the reader to look past West's "weakness for melodrama" in a few instances and enjoy her "naturalist's ear and eye for detail, an unsentimental view of human failings and a clear, crisp narrative style". Oprah Winfrey's production company turned the novel into two-part television miniseries, The Wedding in 1998.

Last years and death
Documentary filmmaker Salem Mekuria used West as one of the principal sources for her half-hour study of the Black community on Martha's Vineyard, Our Place in the Sun (1988), and then created a biographical study As I Remember It: A Portrait of Dorothy West (1991). Both received Emmy nominations.

After her re-emergence as a writer, she was a celebrated figure on the Vineyard. Guests at her 90th birthday party included Henry Louis Gates Jr., Anita Hill, Jessye Norman and Charles Ogletree.

Two years before she died, West won an Anisfield-Wolf Book Award for Lifetime Achievement.

West died on August 16, 1998, at the age of 91, at the New England Medical Center in Boston. Though her cause of death was never officially released, it is thought that she died of natural causes. At her death, she was one of the last surviving members of the Harlem Renaissance. When asked what she wanted her legacy to be, she responded: "That I hung in there. That I didn't say I can't."

Selected writings
  reissued by The Feminist Press, 1982

Papers
James Weldon Johnson Collection, Yale University
 Mugar Memorial Library, Boston University

See also

 African-American literature

References

Sources
 Shockley, Ann Allen, Afro-American Women Writers 1746-1933: An Anthology and Critical Guide, New Haven, Connecticut: Meridian Books, 1989. 
Sherrard Johnson, Cherene, Dorothy West's Paradise: A Biography of Class and Color, New Brunswick, New Jersey: Rutgers University Press, 2012.

External links
 ; Mekuria's 1991 biographical documentary film (complete)

20th-century African-American women writers
20th-century African-American writers
20th-century American novelists
20th-century American short story writers
20th-century American women writers
1907 births
1998 deaths
African-American novelists
American women novelists
American women short story writers
Harlem Renaissance
Novelists from Massachusetts
Federal Writers' Project people
Writers from Boston
Boston Latin Academy alumni